The Bridal Room is a 1912 silent short film drama directed by William Robert Daly and some sources credit King Baggot both of whom have roles in the film. It was produced by Carl Laemmle of IMP, a forerunner of Universal Pictures.

This film is preserved at the Library of Congress, Packard Campus for Audio-Visual Conservation .

Cast
King Baggot - Tom Walsh
Violet Horner - Mary Carter
Mrs. Allen Walker - Sarah Walsh (*billed as Lucille Walker)
William Robert Daly - Pietro
Tom McEvoy - Frank Stone
James Kirkwood - unknown role

References

External links
The Bridal Room at IMDb.com

1912 films
American silent short films
American black-and-white films
Universal Pictures short films
1912 short films
1912 drama films
Silent American drama films
Independent Moving Pictures films
Films produced by Carl Laemmle
Films directed by William Robert Daly
1910s American films